Katarzyna Elżbieta Dydek (born 21 March 1970 in Warsaw) is a retired Polish basketball player who competed in the 2000 Summer Olympics. She also played for the Colorado Xplosion of the now-defunct American Basketball League.

She is the older sister of Małgorzata 'Margo' Dydek (1974–2011).

References

1970 births
Living people
Polish women's basketball players
Olympic basketball players of Poland
Basketball players at the 2000 Summer Olympics
Colorado Xplosion players
Polish expatriate basketball people in the United States
Polish Roman Catholics
Basketball players from Warsaw